The Ford Quadricycle was the first vehicle developed by Henry Ford. Ford's first car was a simple frame with a gas-powered engine and four bicycle wheels mounted on it.

The earliest cars were hand built, one by one, and very expensive. The peculiar machines were seen as toys for the rich.
In the 1890s, the "horseless carriage" was a relatively new idea, with no one having a fixed, universal idea of what a car should look like or how it should work. Most of the first car builders were inventors, rather than businessmen, working with their imaginations and the parts they had on hand.  Thus, the invention of the Quadricycle marks an important innovation as a proto-automobile that would lay the foundation for the future, with more practical designs to follow.

On June 4, 1896, in a tiny workshop behind his home on 58 Bagley Avenue, Detroit, where the Michigan Building now stands, Ford put the finishing touches on his pure ethanol-powered motor. After more than two years of experimentation, Ford, at the age of 32, had completed his first experimental automobile. He dubbed his creation the "Quadricycle," so named because it ran on four bicycle tires, and because of the means through which the engine drove the back wheels. The success of the little vehicle led to the founding of the Detroit Automobile Company in 1899, followed by the Henry Ford Company in 1901 and then later the Ford Motor Company in 1903.

The two cylinder engine could produce 4 horsepower. The  Quadricycle was driven by a chain. The tiller-steered machine had wire wheels and a  fuel tank under the seat. Ford would later go on to found the Ford Motor Company and become one of the world's richest men.

The original Quadricycle resides at The Henry Ford Museum in Dearborn, Michigan.

See also
Quadricycle

References

External links

Vehicles introduced in 1896
Quadricycle
First car made by manufacturer
Cars powered by boxer engines
Michigan State Historic Sites in Wayne County, Michigan